The HoagieNation Festival was started in 2017 by Philadelphia's own pop rock duo, Hall & Oates, as a "celebration of everything Philly". Being described by Daryl Hall, HoagieNation is  “a wonderful and colorful place where the citizens are united by a love of cold meat and Amoroso’s rolls.” Meanwhile, John Oates described Philly as being “famous for a lot of things” with the highlights being “the amazing music” and “the hoagie,” which the duo were “[putting] it all together.” The festival was recognized by Mayor of Philadelphia Jim Kenney, who said that “Daryl and John hold a special place in the hearts of Philadelphia music fans,” and that “we are extremely excited that they are launching their first-ever curated festival back where it all began, right here in Philadelphia.” The festival has featured many artists, in addition to Hall & Oates, that are local to Philadelphia, including G. Love & Special Sauce, Tommy Conwell & The Young Rumblers, the Soul Survivors, and many others.

The festival returned in 2018, which would be the final year for the festival at Festival Pier at Penn's Landing. It was announced in 2019 that Festival Pier was “on sabbatical,” according to Geoff Gordon, of Live Nation, which many took as a sign the venue was closed for good. In 2019, HoagieNation took a hiatus, as it was posted on their official social media that the festival was “taking a little hiatus in 2019 to fine tune our menu, location and explore some new and exciting options for you.”

The festival announced their return, with a planned festival at the Mann Center for the Performing Arts on May 23, 2020. Guests planned to appear included Daryl Hall & John Oates, Squeeze, Kool & the Gang, The Hooters, Blues Traveler, Low Cut Connie, Melanie Fiona, Natalie Price, the Soul Survivors, and Down North. However, on April 2, 2020, the festival announced that the show would be rescheduled from May 23 to September 4, 2020, due to the COVID-19 pandemic. This was later rescheduled again to August 7, 2021.

Festivities held as part of HogieNation have included a Hoagie Happy Hour sponsored by Dietz & Watson, a WIP Hoagie Eating Contest, a pre-party held the night before the 2018 festival, and visits from many local Philadelphia food trucks and restaurants to serve area food staples.

Festivals

References

Music festivals in Philadelphia
Music festivals established in 2017
Rock festivals in the United States
Hall & Oates